Mohit Shantilal Shah (born 9 September 1953) is a former Chief Justice of the Bombay High Court whose term was from June 2010 till September 2015. He previously worked as Chief Justice of Calcutta High Court from December 2009 to June 2010.

Early life
Shah was born in Vijapur city of Gujarat. His initial education happened at Baroda, Surat and Amreli. Later, he obtained his Bachelor of Arts in political science from the Maharaja Sayajirao University of Baroda. Shah was adjudged a gold medallist for his performance in his Law course examination in 1976.

Career 
He was appointed a judge of the Gujarat High Court in 1995. He then worked as Chief Justice of Calcutta High Court from December 2009 to June 2010. He retired in 2015.

References 

Living people
21st-century Indian judges
Chief Justices of the Calcutta High Court
Chief Justices of the Bombay High Court
Maharaja Sayajirao University of Baroda alumni
People from Mehsana district
1953 births
Judges of the Gujarat High Court